Ian O'Neill Brown (born 11 September 1965) is an English football manager and former player.

Biography
A striker, he was a schoolboy at Luton Town before beginning his professional career at Birmingham City, but dropped into non-League after only playing for 10 minutes as a substitute in a Football League Cup match. He played for several clubs in the Eastern Counties League, including Harwich & Parkeston, where he played under former Arsenal player, Richie Powling, then later Chelmsford City, before returning to the professional game with Bristol City in 1993. After a loan spell at Colchester United and less than a year with Northampton Town, he returned to non-League with Sudbury Town, reuniting with Powling.

He was later signed by Powling for Cambridge City and Braintree Town, and after a spell at Maldon Town, went on to become a player-coach at Whitton United. After a spell as coach and assistant manager at Ipswich Wanderers, he was appointed manager of Whitton United in 2009. He left the club in 2011, becoming a coach at Hadleigh United, before joining A.F.C. Sudbury as first team coach in November 2012. He later became assistant manager, before leaving the club in 2014. In 2015, he was appointed manager of Hadleigh United, a position he held until resigning in May 2016. The following year he was appointed joint manager of the Suffolk FA's under-18 team.  He also works as a tutor at One College.

References

1965 births
Living people
Footballers from Suffolk
Sportspeople from Ipswich
English footballers
Luton Town F.C. players
Birmingham City F.C. players
Felixstowe & Walton United F.C. players
Harwich & Parkeston F.C. players
Stowmarket Town F.C. players
Sudbury Town F.C. players
Chelmsford City F.C. players
Bristol City F.C. players
Colchester United F.C. players
Northampton Town F.C. players
Cambridge City F.C. players
Braintree Town F.C. players
Witham Town F.C. players
F.C. Clacton players
Maldon & Tiptree F.C. players
Whitton United F.C. players
English football managers
Ipswich Wanderers F.C.
A.F.C. Sudbury non-playing staff
Whitton United F.C. managers
Hadleigh United F.C. managers
Association football forwards
Association football coaches